The Ape and the Sushi Master is a popular science book by Frans de Waal. It is an overview of animal behavior and psychology, with an emphasis on primates.

It places a special emphasis on the anthropomorphological traits of primates of several different species. It also includes a short history of anthropomorphology and some of that field's pioneers.

Publication data

References

Anthropology books
2001 non-fiction books
Apes